In plasma physics, plasma confinement refers to the act of maintaining a plasma in a discrete volume. Confining plasma is required in order to achieve fusion power. There are two major approaches to confinement: magnetic confinement and inertial confinement.

See also
List of plasma (physics) articles

References

Plasma physics